Grodzisko Dolne  is a village in Leżajsk County, Subcarpathian Voivodeship, in south-eastern Poland. It is the seat of the gmina (administrative district) called Gmina Grodzisko Dolne.

References

Grodzisko Dolne